American rapper and singer Juice Wrld released four studio albums, nine extended plays, two mixtapes, 35 singles (including four as featured artist), and one promotional single, including posthumous releases. He released his first mixtape and EP, under the pseudonym JuiceTheKidd in early 2015 and 2016. Throughout 2017, he released several EPs independently.

Following his signing to Grade A, a subsidiary of Interscope, Juice Wrld released his debut album Goodbye & Good Riddance in May 2018. The album debuted at  15 and peaked at  4 on the Billboard 200. On December 5, 2018, the album was certified platinum by the Recording Industry Association of America (RIAA). It spawned five singles, including his debut single "All Girls Are the Same", certified sextuple platinum and his breakthrough hit "Lucid Dreams", which peaked at No. 2 on the Billboard Hot 100 and is certified Diamond,  by the RIAA. In June 2018, Juice Wrld released a tribute EP, Too Soon.., in honor of rappers Lil Peep and XXXTentacion. The EP produced the singles "Rich and Blind" and "Legends", which were respectively certified gold and platinum by the RIAA. Juice Wrld released a collaborative mixtape alongside Future, titled Wrld on Drugs in October 2018. It debuted at No. 2 on the Billboard 200, selling 98,000 album-equivalent units, which included 8,000 pure album sales. Furthermore, it peaked in the top twenty in Denmark, Sweden, Netherlands, Norway and peaked at No. 5 in Canada. The mixtape was supported through the single "Fine China", which peaked at No. 26 on the Billboard Hot 100 and is certified 2× platinum by the RIAA.

Juice Wrld's second studio album Death Race for Love, was released in March 2019. Led by the singles "Robbery" and "Hear Me Calling", it debuted at number one on the Billboard 200 with 165,000 album-equivalent units. "Bandit" with YoungBoy Never Broke Again was Juice Wrld's final release before his death.

On April 23, 2020, Higgins' estate announced on his Instagram account that his first posthumous single, "Righteous", would be released later that night. "Righteous" was released at midnight on April 24, 2020, and an accompanying music video with footage of Higgins was uploaded to his YouTube channel. Higgins recorded the song at his home studio in Los Angeles. On May 29, the song "Tell Me U Luv Me" featuring Trippie Redd was released alongside a music video directed by Cole Bennett. These songs are included on his first posthumous album, titled Legends Never Die.

On July 6, Higgins' estate publicly announced the late rapper's first posthumous album Legends Never Die. On the same day, Higgins' estate also released "Life's a Mess" featuring Halsey and "Come & Go" a few days later on July 9 featuring Marshmello. The album was released on July 10, 2020, with 21 songs and 5 singles that Higgins' estate claims "best represents the music Juice was in the process of creating". The album debuted at number one on the Billboard 200 with 497,000 album-equivalent units. Five of the songs reached the top 10 of the Billboard Hot 100 on the week ending July 25, 2020: "Come & Go", "Wishing Well", "Conversations", "Life's a Mess", and "Hate the Other Side", which reached number two, five, seven, nine, and ten, respectively. Higgins is the third artist to ever accomplish this feat, the other two being The Beatles and Drake. "Life's a Mess" notably jumped from number 74 to number nine that week.

Albums

Studio albums

Mixtapes

EPs

Singles

As lead artist

As featured artist

Promotional singles

Other charted and certified songs

Guest appearances

Music videos

Notes

References

Hip hop discographies
Discographies of American artists